Umari District is one of four districts of the province Pachitea in Peru.

See also 
 Usnu

References